The Buffalo Bandits are a lacrosse team based in Buffalo, New York playing in the National Lacrosse League (NLL). The 2014 season was their twenty-third season in the NLL.

After finishing last in the East and missing the playoffs in 2013, the Bandits fired head coach Darris Kilgour and hired his former assistant coach Troy Cordingley, recently fired by the Toronto Rock despite winning the Les Bartley Award.

The Bandits started the 2014 season strong. They lost their first game, but then won their next five straight and eight of their next nine, looking much stronger than the 2013 Bandits who missed the playoffs. But the Bandits seemed to return to their 2013 form after that, losing their last eight straight and finishing third in the division. But the losing streak ended in the playoffs, as they took out the Toronto Rock in Toronto in the division semi-finals. In the division finals, the Bandits won game one of the two-game series against Rochester. But the Knighthawks came back to win game two and the resulting mini-game to take the division and end the Bandits' up-and-down season. The Knighthawks would go on to win the NLL Championship, their third straight.

Standings

Game log
Reference:

Playoffs 

New to the 2014 season, the Conference Finals and Championship will expand to a two-game series from the previous single-game elimination setup. The top seed from each division will play the winner of the Division Semifinal game between the second and third seeds, with the lower-seeded team hosting the first game and the higher seed hosting the second game of the series. A team which wins both games will win the two-game series. In the event of a series split with both teams winning one game, a 10-minute tiebreaker game will be played immediately following the conclusion of the second contest to determine the winner of the playoff series. If the teams are still tied after 10 minutes, they would play sudden-death overtime. The Championship would be decided by a similar two-game series.

Game log

Roster

Transactions

Trades

Entry Draft
The 2013 NLL Entry Draft took place on September 16, 2013. The Bandits made the following selections:

See also
2014 NLL season

References

Buffalo
Buffalo Bandits seasons
Buffalo Bandits